George R. Blaney (born November 12, 1939) is an American former basketball player and coach.

Blaney played high school basketball at St. Peter's Preparatory School in Jersey City.

After playing basketball at the College of the Holy Cross during the late 1950s and early 1960s, the 6'1" Blaney spent one season with the New York Knicks of the National Basketball Association. He served as the head basketball coach at Stonehill College from 1967 to 1969 and Dartmouth College from 1969 to 1971. From 1972 to 1994, he served as head coach of Holy Cross, compiling a 357–276 overall record.  He then became head coach at Seton Hall University, where he led the team to the NIT twice before being fired following the 1996–97 season.

In 2000, he began serving as an assistant head coach at the University of Connecticut.  Blaney, while filling in for Jim Calhoun, made he history at UConn on January 23, 2010 when UConn defeated the top–ranked of Texas Longhorns, 88–74.  It marked the first time that an opponent had come to Gampel Pavilion ranked first in the nation, and was subsequently the first time UConn ousted the nation's top team at home.

Blaney also filled in for Calhoun for 11 games in the 2011–12 season.  He is credited with the first three games of the 2011–12 Big East Conference season, when Calhoun sat out a conference-imposed suspension for recruiting violations.  He also served as interim coach throughout February 2012, when Calhoun went on medical leave; those eight games, however, are credited to Calhoun.

Blaney announced his retirement on June 13, 2013.

References

1939 births
Living people
Allentown Jets players
American men's basketball coaches
American men's basketball players
Basketball coaches from New Jersey
Basketball players from Jersey City, New Jersey
Camden Bullets players
College men's basketball head coaches in the United States
Dartmouth Big Green men's basketball coaches
Holy Cross Crusaders men's basketball coaches
Holy Cross Crusaders men's basketball players
New York Knicks draft picks
New York Knicks players
Seton Hall Pirates men's basketball coaches
Shooting guards
Sportspeople from Jersey City, New Jersey
St. Peter's Preparatory School alumni
Stonehill Skyhawks men's basketball coaches
UConn Huskies men's basketball coaches